Friday Night Videos (later becoming Friday Night and then Late Friday) is an American music video show that was broadcast on NBC from July 29, 1983, to May 24, 2002. It was the network's attempt to capitalize on the emerging popularity of music videos as seen on MTV. From January 5, 2001, to August 30, 2002, the show changed to Late Friday showcasing new stand-up comedian talent with original video of sets from a stand-up club like setting, with an established comedian as guest host.

History

Early years
Friday Night Videos was initially produced by Dick Ebersol. From 1974 until 1981, in his role as Director of Late Night Programming at NBC, he co-produced The Midnight Special with that series' creator, Burt Sugarman. Ebersol departed from The Midnight Special in 1981 to take over as the executive producer of his co-creation with Lorne Michaels, Saturday Night Live. Upon doing this, The Midnight Special was canceled and replaced by the Canadian-import sketch comedy program SCTV, which turned out to be a placeholder on NBC's late Friday night/early Saturday morning schedule for a two-year period. SCTV was a quick, cheap solution to an emergency scheduling gap created by Ebersol's urgent departure and was probably not intended to be permanent to start with.

As such, while at SNL, a show that had just gotten back on its feet after some years of decline due to break-out cast members such as Eddie Murphy and Joe Piscopo, Ebersol decided that he would attempt another Friday night music-based program and, instead of simply reviving The Midnight Special, his idea grew into what would become Friday Night Videos, which would replace SCTV in 1983; that show ran for one more year on the pay cable channel Cinemax in the U.S. before discontinuing production in 1984.

In its early years, MTV was still a phenomenon that only a minority of Americans actually could see in their homes, as there were many areas not yet serviced by cable television (particularly rural areas and inner-city neighborhoods), and not all cable television providers offered MTV at first. Friday Night Videos took advantage of that fact and proved to be the next best thing for many viewers.  While it primarily showcased music videos by popular top 40 acts of the day, unlike its cable rival, Friday Night Videos tended to offer more variety. As such, it featured artists from the genres of pop, rock, R&B, and rap.

In the beginning, like its predecessors The Midnight Special and SCTV, the show ran 90 minutes in length, and consisted of music videos introduced by an off-camera announcer. In addition to this, classic artists of the 1960s and 1970s occasionally appeared in "Hall of Fame Videos", major stars were profiled in "Private Reels", and new clips made their network debuts as "World Premiere Videos".

The most popular feature was "Video Vote". Two videos were played back-to-back, and viewers across the country, with the exception of the West Coast (where the program was seen on tape delay), could call in and vote for one of them, using nationwide 900 numbers for a small per-call fee. The winning video faced a new challenger the following week. When a video won four consecutive video votes, it was declared a "retired champion" and two new videos were introduced the week after, to start over. To increase the number of voters, FNV started to offer free T-shirts every fifteen seconds during the time period when viewers called to register their votes.

Nick Michaels and Scott Muni were the off-camera announcers.

For the show's first few years on the air, the audio portion of the show was presented as a stereo simulcast over FM radio on NBC's owned-and-operated radio stations, along with several affiliates of the NBC Radio Network. This arrangement continued until the launch of television stereo on the NBC Television Network under the MTS standard over a period of two years from fall 1984 until the fall of 1986; it was one of NBC's first programs produced exclusively in stereo.

Celebrity hosts
Beginning on October 18, 1985, FNV had celebrity guests as the weekly hosts.  The first guest hosts were Malcolm-Jamal Warner and Lisa Bonet. As a result of the host banter, the show often would have to slightly shave off bits of the end of the videos to conserve time. Guest hosts would last through March 29, 1991.

Notable hosts included:

Timeslot change, new edition of show added: Saturday Morning Videos
On June 12, 1987, the show was cut from 90 minutes to an hour, and its starting time was moved back from 12:30 a.m./ET to 1:30 a.m., as a result of Late Night with David Letterman, which had previously only aired Monday-Thursday nights (Tuesday-Friday mornings) at 12:30 a.m. and had become a major ratings hit by that point, adding a Friday night (Saturday morning) broadcast.

In early 1990, NBC sporadically ran a Saturday morning edition of FNV for viewers who missed the show hours earlier because of its late-night timeslot. These episodes, however, were usually not repeats of the new episode that just aired earlier in the AM but instead tended to be a compilation of past guest hosts. That fall, the network premiered a clone show on the Saturday morning lineup named Saturday Morning Videos, which followed Saved by the Bell and was basically a campier version of FNV that targeted the lead-in teenage audience. It was canceled in 1992.

In late 1990, much like what was occurring gradually on MTV, FNV began to move away from an all-video format. This occurred probably because the novelty of the video fad had begun to wear off and the preferences of FNV's target audience of teens and young adults moved at the same time toward newer, more aggressive genres such as grunge, hardcore rap, and what became indie rock. These were forms that NBC was reluctant to put on FNV broadcasts due to perceived lack of commercial appeal (i.e., except for grunge, little or no radio airplay) and potential obscenity issues in the videos. Regular bumper segments were added instead, featuring various comedians. Those grew to the point that some years later, such material would overtake the final iteration of the program (see below).

In 1991, live in-studio musical performances, again to emulate an MTV trend of the time (e.g., Unplugged), were added. On April 5, Tom Kenny, a then-unknown comedian who would gain fame through voice acting, most notably as SpongeBob SquarePants, became the regular on-screen host, joined by longtime New York R&B deejay Frankie Crocker, who hosted his own feature, "Frankie Crocker's Journal", which highlighted important dates in music history.  Crocker later became the host, followed by Darryl M. Bell and eventually Tonight Show Band leader Branford Marsalis in 1993.

Format change
[[File:FridayNight logo.jpg|left|thumb|250px|Friday Night'''s logo]]
In January 1994, after years of falling ratings and seemingly becoming more and more insignificant in the wake of the cable television boom that allowed more households to have access to MTV, the show was retooled in an attempt to stay relevant.

Beginning with the January 14 broadcast, production of the show moved to NBC Studios in Burbank from New York and the name was shortened to Friday Night. Additionally, it became less of a music video show and more of a general entertainment and variety program, featuring celebrity interviews, stand-up comedy, movie reviews, live performances, viewer polls, and comedy sketches. Subsequently, the show now only made room to air approximately two music videos per episode. The new format also brought two new hosts: comedians Henry Cho and Rita Sever. Brian Copeland delivered humorous commentary on the news of the week in his segment, "The World According To Copeland". In 1996, Sever took over as sole host. The old Video Vote segment, meanwhile, was brought back and renamed "Friday Night Jukebox."

For the host segments after 1998, Sever would be seated or standing in front of the giant videoscreen on the right side of The Tonight Show with Jay Leno set, near the guest's entrance.

The twilight years

In 2000, despite having its highest ratings in years, the show was once again reformatted by NBC for budgetary reasons, occasioned in part by a minor economic recession at the time. Under that title, Friday Nights last telecast was December 29, after a seven-year run under that moniker. On January 5, 2001, the show returned under the name Late Friday. Discontinuing the music and feature segments entirely, the show now solely revolved around stand-up comedians performing their stage routines. Late Friday continued to air until Last Call with Carson Daly was expanded to five nights a week in May 2002; that show had just begun in January of that year as a Monday-Thursday (Tuesday-Friday mornings) strip at 1:30 a.m. Eastern. NBC opted not to relocate Late Friday and dropped the program after a 19-year run, the last 16 months or so under its final format. The cancellation marked the end of 29 years of NBC scheduling a weekly Friday late-night music or comedy/variety show; since then, the former Friday Night timeslot was later filled with A Little Late with Lilly Singh after Last Call ended in 2019; A Little Late'' ran until June 2021, at which time NBC gave back the former timeslot back to its affiliates.

See also 
List of late night network TV programs

References

External links
 
 Videos out, comics in on NBC

1983 American television series debuts
2002 American television series endings
1980s American late-night television series
1990s American late-night television series
2000s American late-night television series
1980s American music television series
1990s American music television series
2000s American music television series
1980s American variety television series
1990s American variety television series
2000s American variety television series
English-language television shows
NBC original programming
Pop music television series
NBC late-night programming